Chhatara is a village in Achham District in the Seti Zone of western Nepal. At the time of the 1991 Nepal census, the village had a population of 2642 living in 522 houses. No population information was given for the 2001 Nepal census.

References

Populated places in Achham District
Village development committees in Achham District